Melton Mowbray railway station serves the market town of Melton Mowbray in Leicestershire, England. It is owned by Network Rail and operated by East Midlands Railway, though CrossCountry operates most of the services as part of its  to  route. The station is on the route of the Syston and Peterborough Railway, which is now part of the Birmingham to Peterborough Line. It has a ticket office, which is staffed part-time, a car park, and help points for times when no staff are present.

History
The station opened as Melton on 1 September 1846, with two sections of the Syston and Peterborough line, from Leicester to Melton and Stamford to Peterborough. The opening of the former had been delayed by opposition from a landowner, Lord Harborough.

The building is thought to have been designed by William Parsons and Sancton Wood. It was built by the contractor Herberts at a then cost of £3,021. The porte-cochère was added later by the Midland Railway in an attempt to improve the station in response to competition from the Great Northern and London and North Western Joint Railway which opened its station, in 1879.

The station was badly damaged by a snowstorm on Tuesday 11 April 1876. Fortunately there were no passengers on the platforms and no fatalities. A small section of remaining roof in poor condition was yanked down with a long chain, using a locomotive. The line was cleared in about three hours. 

The station has had several names during its existence. After opening as Melton in 1846 it was renamed Melton Mowbray on 1 November 1876 and then Melton Mowbray South in 1923. In 1957 it was renamed Melton Mowbray Town to distinguish it from Melton Mowbray North  (though this had closed to regular traffic in 1953). It was given its current name on 14 June 1965.

It was refurbished in 2011 with re-glazed platform canopies, resurfaced platforms, passenger information screens, improved disabled access to the barrow crossing, a full repaint and a new footbridge. Following this, Melton Mowbray won a "highly commended" award at the National Rail Awards 2014 as Small station of the year.

Stationmasters

J. Withers, c. 1849–1850, former station master at Syston, afterwards at Grantham
John Willis, 1850–1862
George William Earp, 1862–1864
W. Barker, 1864
W. Butterfield, from 1864
Robert Jeffrey, c. 1869–1873
T. B. Symonds, 1873–1878, former station master of Berkley Road station, Gloucester, absconded after suspension on 28 November 1878
Thomas Bedington, 1878–1908
Lawrence Palmer Briggs, 1908–1913, afterwards station master at Trent
James Sparling, 1913–1929, former station master at Rowsley
Frederick Charles Robinson, 1929–1940

Services

Melton Mowbray has an hourly service off-peak in both directions operated by CrossCountry. Westbound trains run to Birmingham via ,  and Coleshill. Additional trains run at peak times, with some terminating at Cambridge.

Despite managing the station, East Midlands Railway (EMR) only operates limited services to the station: a single daily return service to London St Pancras via Corby commenced on 27 April 2009. It is notable as the first regular passenger service to cross the historic Welland Viaduct on the Oakham to Kettering line since 1966. The company introduced a further return service from  via East Midlands Parkway (for East Midlands Airport) from May 2010. Further services are being considered.

A handful of local services operate at either end of the day, mainly for train-crew route-knowledge retention purposes.

Former services
According to the Official Handbook of Stations the following classes of traffic were being handled at this station in 1956: G, P, F, L, H, C and there was a 7-ton crane.

Part of the former Nottingham direct line of the Midland Railway is now used as the Old Dalby Test Track. This leaves the Leicester line a short distance to the west of Melton Mowbray station and runs towards Nottingham via Old Dalby, continuing as far as the Nottingham suburb of Edwalton.

References

External links

Melton Mowbray
Railway stations in Leicestershire
DfT Category E stations
Former Midland Railway stations
Railway stations in Great Britain opened in 1846
Railway stations in Great Britain closed in 1848
Railway stations in Great Britain opened in 1848
Railway stations served by East Midlands Railway
Railway stations served by CrossCountry
1846 establishments in England